Ted Kaufman (born 1939) was a United States Senator from Delaware from 2009 to 2010. Senator Kaufman, Kaufmann, or Kauffman may also refer to:

David S. Kaufman (1813–1851), Republic of Texas State Senate
Claudia Kauffman (fl. 2000s–2010s), Washington State Senate
Christine Kaufmann (politician) (born 1951), Montana State Senate